Árboles is an album from Puerto Rican singer Roy Brown and Cuban singer Silvio Rodríguez, along with Cuban septet Afrocuba. Brown and Rodríguez has collaborated previously, but this is the first album where they are billed together.

Background and recording

Árboles was recorded from January to February 1987 at EGREM Studios in Havana, Cuba. It features five songs by Roy Brown, and two songs by Rodríguez. The last song, "Árboles", is sung by Brown and Rodríguez together. It is based on a poem by Clemente Soto Vélez. The album also features singing contributions from Cubans Pablo Milanés (on "Negrito bonito") and Anabell López (on "Ohé Nené"). This album is also notable for featuring the first version of "Boricua en la luna", which has probably become Brown's most popular song.

Track listing

Personnel

Musicians 
 Pablo Milanés - vocals on Track 4
 Anabell López - vocals on Track 6

Afrocuba 
 Oriente López
 Óscar Valdés
 Ernán López-Nussa
 Fernando "Teo" Calveiro
 Fernando Acosta
 Marios Luis Pino
 Ómar Hernández
 Edilio Montero

Notes 

1987 albums
Roy Brown (Puerto Rican musician) albums
Silvio Rodríguez albums